Rich Gulch (formerly, Pleasant Springs) is an unincorporated community in Calaveras County, California,  east-northeast of Mokelumne Hill. It lies at an elevation of 1903 feet (580 m).

A post office was opened at Pleasant Springs in 1855. The name was changed to Rich Gulch in 1857. The post office was closed in 1867, re-established in 1887, and closed for good in 1903.

References

External links

Unincorporated communities in California
Unincorporated communities in Calaveras County, California
1855 establishments in California